Eupyra is a genus of moths in the subfamily Arctiinae. The genus was erected by Gottlieb August Wilhelm Herrich-Schäffer in 1853.

Species
 Eupyra affinis Rothschild, 1912
 Eupyra consors Schaus, 1892
 Eupyra disticta Hampson, 1898
 Eupyra distincta Rothschild, 1912
 Eupyra imperialis Herrich-Schäffer, 1853
 Eupyra psittacus Schaus, 1892
 Eupyra sages Druce, 1895
 Eupyra sarama Dognin, 1891

References

Arctiinae